P & T (later NITEL) Vasco da Gama was a Nigerian football club based in Enugu. It was sponsored by the Post and Telecommunications Department (P & T) of the Ministry of Communications.
The team was a founder member of the Nigerian League in 1972 and took its name from Brazilian squad CR Vasco da Gama.
The name changed when NITEL was created from the merger of the P & T with the Nigerian External Telecommunications Limited (NET.) in the mid-1980s.

The team was promoted to the premier league in 1993 after finishing second in the Second Division. However they were relegated after a record of 9 wins 10 ties and 13 losts (41 points). Vasco spent 1995 and 1996 in the second division before its management announced the disbandment of the club late November, 1996.

In 1997, the team's league slot was bought by the Akwa Ibom government and reborn as the Ibom Stars FC, the predecessor of Akwa United F.C.

References

External links
 Back in the Day Series – Nigerian Football (80s) AfricanLoft
 Rangers vs. Vasco: Excellence Wrought by J. B. Ogufere (Kwenu.com

Football clubs in Nigeria
Defunct football clubs in Nigeria
Association football clubs established in 1970
Enugu
Association football clubs disestablished in 1996
1996 disestablishments in Nigeria
Sports clubs in Nigeria